The Unnatural and Accidental Women is a play by Metis playwright Marie Clements about the disappearance of multiple Indigenous women from the Downtown Eastside of Vancouver whose deaths of extremely high blood-alcohol levels were all caused by one man, Gilbert Paul Jordan.

In an attempt to reclaim the lives and importance of the victims, which was largely ignored by press coverage of the Jordan case, Clements' play is a surrealist exploration that jumps around in time to show the women in the final days before their deaths. Through the figure of the daughter of one of the victims, who is searching for answers to her mother's disappearance, the women are brought back to life and talk about their hopes, desires, and challenges as residents of "Skid Row" in Vancouver.

Characters 
 Rebecca — ages 4 and 30, Mixed blood/Native, a writer
 Rose — age 52, English immigrant
 Aunt Shadie — age 52, Native, later revealed to be Rebecca's mother
 Mavis — age 42, Native
 The Woman — age 27, Native
 Valerie — age 33, Native
 Verna — age 38, Native
 Violet — ages 27 and 5, Mixed blood/Afro-Canadian
 The Barbershop Women: a singing, dancing trio
 Marilyn — age 25, Native
 Penny — age 30, Native
 Patsy — age 40, Native
 The Barber — ages 30s and 60s, white
 Ron — age 35, a cop

Production history 
The Unnatural and Accidental Women premiered on November 2, 2000, and ran until November 25 at the Firehall Arts Centre in Vancouver.

Produced by Native Earth Performing Arts at Buddies in Bad Times Theatre from November 18 to December 5, 2004.

In 2019, as the first presentation of the National Arts Centre's (NAC) Indigenous Theatre department, the NAC staged The Unnatural and Accidental Women. The production was directed by Muriel Miguel and starred PJ Prudat as Rebecca and Monique Mojica as Aunt Shadie. Miguel's production was the second time Mojica had played Aunt Shadie. Colleen Winton, Yolanda Bonnell, Columpa C. Bobb, Cheri Maracle, Nimikii Couchie-Waukey, Lisa Cromarty, Pierre Brault, Olivier Lamarche, Jenifer Brousseau, Soni Moreno, and Kelsey Wavey also appeared in the show.

See also
Unnatural & Accidental, a 2006 film adaptation

References

Plays based on actual events
Plays set in Canada
Canadian plays
Works about violence against women
Downtown Eastside
Vancouver in fiction
Violence against Indigenous women in Canada

Works about crime in Canada
Crime in British Columbia